Judith Kay Schwomeyer (married name Sladky; born November 14, 1950) is an American actress and former competitive ice dancer. With her skating partner and then-husband, Jim Sladky, she became a four-time World medalist (silver in 1970; bronze in 1969, 1971, 1972) and five-time U.S. national champion (1968–1972).

Personal life 
Judith Kay Schwomeyer was born on November 14, 1950. She graduated from Shortridge High School in Indianapolis. She is the daughter of Herb Schwomeyer, a Butler University coach and administrator, and sister of Sandy Lamb, an ice dancing coach.

She was married to Jim Sladky from 1971 to 1990. She later married Blake Norton.

Career

Skating 
Schwomeyer/Sladky won five national titles, from 1968 to 1972. They finished on the podium at four World Championships, winning silver in 1970 and bronze in 1969, 1971, and 1972). 
  
They were coached by Ron Ludington. Together with Ludington, Schwomeyer/Sladky created the Yankee Polka compulsory dance. They first performed it as a competitive program in 1969. Following their retirement from competitive skating, the duo skated professionally.

They were inducted into the United States Figure Skating Hall of Fame in 1991.

Acting 
Schwomeyer has worked as an actress. She is the Muppeteer of Alice Snuffleupagus in Sesame Street and portrayed Snoopy in Jingle All the Way.

Competition results

References

External links
 

American female ice dancers
American actresses
Sesame Street Muppeteers
1950 births
Living people
World Figure Skating Championships medalists